Kyle Jerome Kacal (born December 26, 1969) is an American politician. He served as a Republican member for the 12th district of the Texas House of Representatives.

Kacal was born in College Station, Texas. He attended Texas A&M University, where he earned a Bachelor of Arts in political science in 1992. He then attended Texas Christian University, where he receive a certificate in ranch management in 1993.

In 2012 Kacal was elected for the 12th district of the Texas House of Representatives. He assumed office on January 8, 2013. In 2022 Kacal was nominated as candidate for the 12th district.

References 

1969 births
Living people
People from College Station, Texas
Republican Party members of the Texas House of Representatives
21st-century American politicians
Texas A&M University alumni
Texas Christian University alumni